The Torch Bearer is a 1916 American silent drama film directed by William Russell and Jack Prescott. The film stars Charlotte Burton.

Cast
 Charlotte Burton as Janet Dare
 Harry Keenan as William Wendell
 Marie Van Tassell as Mrs. Huntley-Knox
 William Russell as John Huntley-Knox
 Alan Forrest
 Margaret Nichols
 Rena Carlton
 Nate Watt

External links

1916 films
1916 drama films
Silent American drama films
American silent feature films
American black-and-white films
1910s American films